9C or 9c may refer to :

 Spring Airlines, IATA code 9C
 Ninth Cambridge survey at 15GHz (9C survey)
 Carbon-9 (9C), an isotope of carbon

See also
C9 (disambiguation)